Arrenes is a former community in Kastoria regional unit, Western Macedonia, Greece. Since the 2011 local government reform it is part of the municipality Nestorio, of which it is a municipal unit. The municipal unit has an area of 134.600 km2. Population 548 (2011). The seat of the community was in Eptachori.

Settlements 
The settlements of the municipal unit are:

 Chrysi
 Eptachori
 Pefkofyto
 Zouzouli

References

Populated places in Kastoria (regional unit)
Former municipalities in Western Macedonia